Shibuki Iitsuka (born 23 August 1988) is a Japanese sailor. He competed in the Nacra 17 event at the 2020 Summer Olympics.

References

External links
 

1988 births
Living people
Japanese male sailors (sport)
Olympic sailors of Japan
Sailors at the 2020 Summer Olympics – Nacra 17
Sportspeople from Yokohama
Asian Games medalists in sailing
Sailors at the 2002 Asian Games
Sailors at the 2006 Asian Games
Medalists at the 2002 Asian Games
Medalists at the 2006 Asian Games
Asian Games gold medalists for Japan
Asian Games silver medalists for Japan